CHMO is a Canadian radio station, broadcasting at 1450 AM in Moosonee, Ontario. The station broadcasts a community radio format from studios in Moosonee and Moose Factory.

References

External links
 

Hmo
Hmo
Year of establishment missing